There were 2 volleyball and 2 beach volleyball events at the 2014 South American Games.

Men's beach volleyball

Pool A

|}

|}

Men's volleyball

|}

|}

Women's volleyball

|}

|}

2014 in volleyball
2014 South American Games events
2014